Edward Baker (c. 1775 – 24 February 1862) was an English politician in the Conservative Party. He was the Member of Parliament (MP) for Wilton in Wiltshire from 1823 to 1830. He was re-elected unopposed at the 1837 general election, but stood down from the House of Commons at the 1841 general election.

References

External links

1770s births
1862 deaths
Conservative Party (UK) MPs for English constituencies
UK MPs 1820–1826
UK MPs 1826–1830
UK MPs 1837–1841